Jerod Elcock (born 30 July 1998) is a Trinidad and Tobago sprinter. He won a silver medal in the   relay at the 2019 Pan American Games. He also won a silver medal in the same event at the 2022 Commonwealth Games. At the 2022 World Athletics Indoor Championships, he competed in the 60 metres, where he placed 6th in the final.

He competed for Butler Community College in El Dorado, Kansas, where he was named the 2022 NJCAA Outdoor Track and Field Athlete of the Year.

Personal bests
Outdoor
100 metres – 10.03 (Port-of-Spain 2022)
200 metres – 20.64 (El Dorado, KS 2022)
400 metres – 47.21 (Arima 2017)
Indoor
60 metres – 6.60 (Pittsburg, KS 2022)
200 metres – 21.85 (Topeka, KS 2021)

References

External links
 

1998 births
Living people
Trinidad and Tobago male sprinters
World Athletics Championships athletes for Trinidad and Tobago
Athletes (track and field) at the 2019 Pan American Games
Pan American Games silver medalists for Trinidad and Tobago
Pan American Games medalists in athletics (track and field)
Medalists at the 2019 Pan American Games
Commonwealth Games competitors for Trinidad and Tobago
Commonwealth Games silver medallists for Trinidad and Tobago
Commonwealth Games medallists in athletics
Athletes (track and field) at the 2022 Commonwealth Games
Medallists at the 2022 Commonwealth Games